Mongol military tactics and organization enabled the Mongol Empire to conquer nearly all of continental Asia, along with parts of the Middle East and Eastern Europe.

That system was founded originally on the expansion of the nomadic lifestyle of the Mongols. Other elements were invented by Genghis Khan, his generals, and his successors. Technologies useful for attacking fortifications were adapted from other cultures. Foreign technical experts were integrated into the command structure. In many cases, the Mongols defeated significantly larger armies.

Transfer of troops between units was forbidden. The leaders on each level had significant license to execute their orders in the way they considered best. This command structure was highly flexible and allowed the Mongol army to attack en masse, divide into smaller groups to encircle their enemies and either lead them into an ambush or divide into small groups of roughly 10 to mop up a fleeing and broken army. Although they fought as a unit, individual soldiers were responsible for their equipment, weapons, and up to five mounts. Their families and herds would accompany them on foreign expeditions.

Standing above other units was an elite force called Kheshig. They functioned as imperial guard of the Mongol Empire as well as a training ground for potential young officers. Subutai, a powerful Mongol general, started his career in the Kheshig.

Mobility 

Each Mongol soldier typically maintained 3 or 4 horses. Changing horses often allowed them to travel at high speed for days without stopping or wearing out the animals. When one horse became tired, the rider would dismount and rotate to another. Though the used mount would still have to travel, it would do so without the weight of the rider. Their ability to live off the land, and in extreme situations off their animals (mare's milk especially), made their armies far less dependent on the traditional logistical apparatus of agrarian armies.

The mobility of individual soldiers made it possible to send them on successful scouting missions, gathering intelligence about routes and searching for terrain suited to the preferred combat tactics of the Mongols.

During the Mongol invasion of Kievan Rus', they used frozen rivers as highways, and winter, the time of year usually off-limits for any major activity due to the intense cold, became the Mongols' preferred time to strike.

To avoid the deadly hail of missiles, enemies would frequently spread out, or seek cover, breaking up their formations and making them more vulnerable to the lancers' charges. Likewise, when they packed themselves together, into dense square or phalanx style formations, they would become more vulnerable to the arrows.

Once the enemy was deemed sufficiently weakened, the noyans would give the order. The drums would beat and the signal flags wave, telling the lancers to begin their charge. Often, the devastation of the arrows was enough to rout an enemy, so the lancers were only needed to help pursue and mop up the remnants. At the Battle of Mohi, the Mongols left open a gap in their ranks, luring the Hungarians into retreating through it. This resulted in the Hungarians being strung out over all the countryside and easy pickings for mounted archers who simply galloped along and picked them off, while the lancers skewered them as they fled.

Training and discipline 

Mongol armies practised horsemanship, archery, and unit tactics, formations and rotations over and over again. This training was maintained by a hard, but not overly harsh or unreasonable, discipline.

Officers and troopers alike were usually given a wide leeway by their superiors in carrying out their orders, so long as the larger objectives of the plan were well served and the orders promptly obeyed. The Mongols thus avoided the pitfalls of overly rigid discipline and micromanagement, which have impeded armed forces throughout history. However, all members had to be unconditionally loyal to each other and to their superiors, and especially to the Khan. If one soldier ran from danger in battle, he and his nine comrades from the same arban would face the death penalty together.

Cavalry 

Six of every ten Mongol troopers were light cavalry horse archers; the remaining four were more heavily armored and armed lancers. Mongol light cavalry were extremely light troops compared to contemporary standards, allowing them to execute tactics and maneuvers that would have been impractical for a heavier enemy (such as European knights). Most of the remaining troops were heavier cavalry with lances for close combat after the archers had brought the enemy into disarray. Soldiers usually carried scimitars or halberds as well.

The Mongols protected their horses in the same way as did they themselves, covering them with lamellar armor. Horse armor was divided into five parts and designed to protect every part of the horse, including the forehead, which had a specially crafted plate, which was tied on each side of the neck.

A warrior relied on his herd to provide him with staple foods of milk and meat; hide for bowstrings, shoes, and armor; dried dung to be used as fuel for his fire; hair for rope, battle standards, musical instruments and helmet decorations; milk also used for shamanistic ceremonies to ensure victory; and for hunting and entertainment that often served as military training.  If he died in battle, a horse would sometimes be sacrificed with him to provide a mount for the afterlife.

All saddles were equipped with stirrups. This technical advantage made it easier for the Mongol archers to turn their upper body, and shoot in all directions, including backward. Mongol warriors would time the loosing of an arrow to the moment when a galloping horse would have all four feet off the ground, thus ensuring a steady, well-aimed shot.

Each soldier had two to 10 horses—so when a horse tired they could change to one of the others. This made them one of the fastest armies in the world, but also made the Mongol army vulnerable to shortages of fodder. Campaigning in arid regions such as Central Asia or forested regions of Southern China were thus difficult and even in ideal steppe terrain, a Mongol force had to keep moving to ensure sufficient grazing for its massive horse herd.

Logistics

Supply 
Mongol armies traveled light, and were able to live largely off the land. Their equipment included fish hooks and other tools meant to make each warrior independent of any fixed supply source. The most common travel food of the Mongols was dried and ground meat borts, which remains common in Mongolian cuisine today. Borts were light and easy to transport, and can be cooked with water similarly to a modern "instant soup".

To ensure they would always have fresh horses, each trooper usually had 3 or 4 mounts. The horse is viewed much like a cow in Mongolia, and is milked and slaughtered for meat as such.  Since most of the Mongols' mounts were mares, they were able to live off their horses' milk or milk products as they moved through enemy territory.  In dire straits, the Mongol warrior could drink some of the blood from his string of remounts. They could survive a whole month on only drinking mare's milk combined with mare's blood.

Heavier equipment was brought up by well organized supply trains. Wagons and carts carried, amongst other things, large stockpiles of arrows. The main logistical factor limiting their advance was finding enough food and water for their animals.  This would lead to serious difficulties during some of the Mongol campaigns, such as their conflicts with the Mamluks, the arid terrain of Syria and the Levant making it difficult for large Mongol armies to penetrate the region, especially given the Mamluks' scorched earth policy of burning grazing lands throughout the region.  It also limited the Mongol ability to exploit their success following the Battle of Mohi, as even the Great Hungarian Plain was not large enough to provide grazing for all the flocks and herds following Subutai's army permanently.

Communications 
The Mongols established a system of postal-relay horse stations called Örtöö, for the fast transfer of written messages. The Mongol mail system was the first such empire-wide service since the Roman Empire. Additionally, Mongol battlefield communication utilized signal flags and horns and to a lesser extent, signal arrows to communicate movement orders during combat.

Armor

The basic armor of the Mongol fighting man consisted of a heavy coat fastened at the waist by a leather belt. From the belt would hang his sword, dagger, and possibly an axe. This long robe-like coat would double over, left breast over right, and be secured with a button a few inches below the right armpit. The coat was lined with fur. Underneath the coat, a shirt-like undergarment with long, wide sleeves was commonly worn. Silk and metallic thread were increasingly used. The Mongols wore protective heavy silk undershirts. Even if an arrow pierced their mail or leather outer garment, the silk from the undershirt would stretch to wrap itself around the arrow as it entered the body, reducing damage caused by the arrow shaft, and making removal of the arrow easier.

The boots were made from felt and leather and, though heavy, would be comfortable and wide enough to accommodate the trousers tucked in before being laced tightly. They were heelless, though the soles were thick and lined with fur. Worn with felt socks, the feet were unlikely to get cold.

Lamellar armor was worn over the thick coat. The armor was composed of small scales of iron, chain mail, or hard leather sewn together with leather tongs and could weigh  if made of leather alone and more if the cuirass was made of metal scales. The leather was first softened by boiling and then coated in a crude lacquer made from pitch, which rendered it waterproof. Sometimes the soldier's heavy coat was simply reinforced with metal plates.

Helmets were cone shaped and composed of iron or steel plates of different sizes and included iron-plated neck guards. The Mongol cap was conical in shape and made of quilted material with a large turned-up brim, reversible in winter, and earmuffs. Whether a soldier's helmet was leather or metal depended on his rank and wealth.

Weapons

Mounted archers were a major part of the armies of the Mongol Empire, for instance at the 13th-century Battle of Liegnitz, where an army including 20,000 horse archers defeated a force of 30,000 troops led by Henry II, duke of Silesia, via demoralization and continued harassment.

Mongol bow

The primary weapon of the Mongol forces was their composite bows made from laminated horn, wood, and sinew. The layer of horn is on the inner face as it resists compression, while the layer of sinew is on the outer face as it resists tension. Such bows, with minor variations, had been the main weapon of steppe herdsmen and steppe warriors for over two millennia; Mongols (and many of their subject peoples) were extremely skilled with them. Some were said to be able to hit a bird on the wing. Composite construction allows a powerful and relatively efficient bow to be made small enough that it can be used easily from horseback.

Quivers containing sixty arrows were strapped to the backs of their cavalrymen and to their horses. Mongol archers typically carried 2 to 3 bows (one heavier and intended for dismounted use, the other lighter and used from horseback) that were accompanied by multiple quivers and files for sharpening their arrowheads. These arrowheads were hardened by plunging them in brine after first heating them red hot.

Shooting from the back of a moving horse may be more accurate if the arrow is loosed in the phase of the gallop when all four of the horse's feet are off the ground.

The Mongols may have also used crossbows (possibly acquired from the Chinese), also both for infantry and cavalry, but these were scarcely ever seen or used in battle. The Manchus forbade archery by their Mongol subjects, and the Mongolian bowmaking tradition was lost during the Qing Dynasty. The present bowmaking tradition emerged after independence in 1921 and is based on Manchu types of bow, somewhat different from the bows known to have been used by the Mongol empire. Mounted archery had fallen into disuse and has been revived only in the 21st century.

Sword
Mongol swords were slightly curved Turko-Mongol sabers, which they used for slashing attacks but could also use to cut and thrust, due to its shape and construction. This made it easier to use from horseback. Warriors could use the sword with a one-handed or two-handed grip.

Gunpowder

Jin dynasty
The first concerted Mongol invasion of Jin occurred in 1211 and total conquest was not accomplished until 1234. In 1232 the Mongols besieged the Jin capital of Kaifeng and deployed gunpowder weapons along with other more conventional siege techniques such as building stockades, watchtowers, trenches, guardhouses, and forcing Chinese captives to haul supplies and fill moats. Jin scholar Liu Qi (劉祈) recounts in his memoir, "the attack against the city walls grew increasingly intense, and bombs rained down as [the enemy] advanced." The Jin defenders also deployed gunpowder bombs as well as fire arrows (huo jian 火箭) launched using a type of early solid-propellant rocket. Of the bombs, Liu Qi writes, "From within the walls the defenders responded with a gunpowder bomb called the heaven-shaking-thunder bomb (震天雷). Whenever the [Mongol] troops encountered one, several men at a time would be turned into ashes." A more fact based and clear description of the bomb exists in the History of Jin: "The heaven-shaking-thunder bomb is an iron vessel filled with gunpowder. When lighted with fire and shot off, it goes off like a crash of thunder that can be heard for a hundred li [thirty miles], burning an expanse of land more than half a mu [所爇圍半畝之上, a mu is a sixth of an acre], and the fire can even penetrate iron armor." A Ming official named He Mengchuan would encounter an old cache of these bombs three centuries later in the Xi'an area: "When I went on official business to Shaanxi Province, I saw on top of Xi'an's city walls an old stockpile of iron bombs. They were called 'heaven-shaking-thunder' bombs, and they were like an enclosed rice bowl with a hole at the top, just big enough to put your finger in. The troops said they hadn't been used for a very long time." Furthermore, he wrote, "When the powder goes off, the bomb rips open, and the iron pieces fly in all directions. That is how it is able to kill people and horses from far away."

Heaven-shaking-thunder bombs, also known as thunder crash bombs, were utilized prior to the siege in 1231 when a Jin general made use of them in destroying a Mongol warship, but during the siege the Mongols responded by protecting themselves with elaborate screens of thick cowhide. This was effective enough for workers to get right up to the walls to undermine their foundations and excavate protective niches. Jin defenders countered by tying iron cords and attaching them to heaven-shaking-thunder bombs, which were lowered down the walls until they reached the place where the miners worked. The protective leather screens were unable to withstand the explosion, and were penetrated, killing the excavators. Another weapon the Jin employed was an improved version of the fire lance called the flying fire lance. The History of Jin provides a detailed description: "To make the lance, use chi-huang paper, sixteen layers of it for the tube, and make it a bit longer than two feet. Stuff it with willow charcoal, iron fragments, magnet ends, sulfur, white arsenic [probably an error that should mean saltpeter], and other ingredients, and put a fuse to the end. Each troop has hanging on him a little iron pot to keep fire [probably hot coals], and when it's time to do battle, the flames shoot out the front of the lance more than ten feet, and when the gunpowder is depleted, the tube isn't destroyed." While Mongol soldiers typically held a view of disdain toward most Jin weapons, apparently they greatly feared the flying fire lance and heaven-shaking-thunder bomb. Kaifeng managed to hold out for a year before the Jin emperor fled and the city capitulated. In some cases Jin troops still fought with some success, scoring isolated victories such as when a Jin commander led 450 fire lancers against a Mongol encampment, which was "completely routed, and three thousand five hundred were drowned." Even after the Jin emperor committed suicide in 1234, one loyalist gathered all the metal he could find in the city he was defending, even gold and silver, and made explosives to lob against the Mongols, but the momentum of the Mongol Empire could not be stopped. By 1234, both the Western Xia and Jin dynasty had been conquered.

Song dynasty
The Mongol war machine moved south and in 1237 attacked the Song city of Anfeng (modern Shouxian, Anhui Province) "using gunpowder bombs [huo pao] to burn the [defensive] towers." These bombs were apparently quite large. "Several hundred men hurled one bomb, and if it hit the tower it would immediately smash it to pieces." The Song defenders under commander Du Gao (杜杲) rebuilt the towers and retaliated with their own bombs, which they called the "Elipao," after a famous local pear, probably in reference to the shape of the weapon. Perhaps as another point of military interest, the account of this battle also mentions that the Anfeng defenders were equipped with a type of small arrow to shoot through eye slits of Mongol armor, as normal arrows were too thick to penetrate.

By the mid 13th century, gunpowder weapons had become central to the Song war effort. In 1257 the Song official Li Zengbo was dispatched to inspect frontier city arsenals. Li considered an ideal city arsenal to include several hundred thousand iron bombshells, and also its own production facility to produce at least a couple of thousand a month. The results of his tour of the border were severely disappointing and in one arsenal he found "no more than 85 iron bomb-shells, large and small, 95 fire-arrows, and 105 fire-lances. This is not sufficient for a mere hundred men, let alone a thousand, to use against an attack by the ... barbarians. The government supposedly wants to make preparations for the defense of its fortified cities, and to furnish them with military supplies against the enemy (yet this is all they give us). What chilling indifference!" Fortunately for the Song, Möngke Khan died in 1259 and the war would not continue until 1269 under the leadership of Kublai Khan, but when it did the Mongols came in full force.

Blocking the Mongols' passage south of the Yangtze were the twin fortress cities of Xiangyang and Fancheng. What resulted was one of the longest sieges the world had ever known, lasting from 1268 to 1273. For the first three years the Song defenders had been able to receive supplies and reinforcements by water, but in 1271 the Mongols set up a full blockade with a formidable navy of their own, isolating the two cities. This didn't prevent the Song from running the supply route anyway, and two men with the surname Zhang did exactly that. The Two Zhangs commanded a hundred paddle wheel boats, travelling by night under the light of lantern fire, but were discovered early on by a Mongol commander. When the Song fleet arrived near the cities, they found the Mongol fleet to have spread themselves out along the entire width of the Yangtze with "vessels spread out, filling the entire surface of the river, and there was no gap for them to enter." Another defensive measure the Mongols had taken was the construction of a chain, which stretched across the water. The two fleets engaged in combat and the Song opened fire with fire-lances, fire-bombs, and crossbows. A large number of men died trying to cut through chains, pull up stakes, and hurl bombs, while Song marines fought hand to hand using large axes, and according to the Mongol record, "on their ships they were up to the ankles in blood." With the rise of dawn, the Song vessels made it to the city walls and the citizens "leapt up a hundred times in joy." In 1273 the Mongols enlisted the expertise of two Muslim engineers, one from Persia and one from Syria, who helped in the construction of counterweight trebuchets. These new siege weapons had the capability of throwing larger missiles further than the previous traction trebuchets. One account records, "when the machinery went off the noise shook heaven and earth; every thing that [the missile] hit was broken and destroyed." The fortress city of Xiangyang fell in 1273.

The next major battle to feature gunpowder weapons was during a campaign led by the Mongol general Bayan, who commanded an army of around two hundred thousand, consisting of mostly Chinese soldiers. It was probably the largest army the Mongols had ever utilized. Such an army was still unable to successfully storm Song city walls, as seen in the 1274 Siege of Shayang. Thus Bayan waited for the wind to change to a northerly course before ordering his artillerists to begin bombarding the city with molten metal bombs, which caused such a fire that "the buildings were burned up and the smoke and flames rose up to heaven." Shayang was captured and its inhabitants massacred.

Gunpowder bombs were used again in the 1275 Siege of Changzhou in the latter stages of the Mongol-Song Wars. Upon arriving at the city, Bayan gave the inhabitants an ultimatum: "if you ... resist us ... we shall drain your carcasses of blood and use them for pillows." This didn't work and the city resisted anyway, so the Mongol army bombarded them with fire bombs before storming the walls, after which followed an immense slaughter claiming the lives of a quarter million. The war lasted for only another four years during which some remnants of the Song held up last desperate defenses. In 1277, 250 defenders under Lou Qianxia conducted a suicide bombing and set off a huge iron bomb when it became clear defeat was imminent. Of this, the History of Song writes, "the noise was like a tremendous thunderclap, shaking the walls and ground, and the smoke filled up the heavens outside. Many of the troops [outside] were startled to death. When the fire was extinguished they went in to see. There were just ashes, not a trace left." So came an end to the Mongol-Song Wars, which saw the deployment of all the gunpowder weapons available to both sides at the time, which for the most part meant gunpowder arrows, bombs, and lances, but in retrospect, another development would overshadow them all, the birth of the gun.

In 1280, a large store of gunpowder at Weiyang in Yangzhou accidentally caught fire, producing such a massive explosion that a team of inspectors at the site a week later deduced that some 100 guards had been killed instantly, with wooden beams and pillars blown sky high and landing at a distance of over 10 li (~2 mi. or ~3 km) away from the explosion, creating a crater more than ten feet deep. One resident described the noise of the explosion as if it "was like a volcano erupting, a tsunami crashing. The entire population was terrified." According to surviving reports, the incident was caused by inexperienced gunpowder makers hired to replace the previous ones, and had been careless while grinding sulfur. A spark caused by the grinding process came into contact with some fire lances which immediately started spewing flames and jetting around "like frightened snakes." The gunpowder makers did nothing as they found the sight highly amusing, that is until one fire lance burst into a cache of bombs, causing the entire complex to explode. The validity of this report is somewhat questionable, assuming everyone within the immediate vicinity was killed.

By the time of Jiao Yu and his Huolongjing (a book that describes military applications of gunpowder in great detail) in the mid 14th century, the explosive potential of gunpowder was perfected, as the level of nitrate in gunpowder formulas had risen from a range of 12% to 91%, with at least 6 different formulas in use that are considered to have maximum explosive potential for gunpowder. By that time, the Chinese had discovered how to create explosive round shot by packing their hollow shells with this nitrate-enhanced gunpowder.

Europe and Japan

Gunpowder may have been used during the Mongol invasions of Europe. "Fire catapults", "pao", and "naphtha-shooters" are mentioned in some sources. However, according to Timothy May, "there is no concrete evidence that the Mongols used gunpowder weapons on a regular basis outside of China."

Shortly after the Mongol invasions of Japan (1274–1281), the Japanese produced a scroll painting depicting a bomb. Called tetsuhau in Japanese, the bomb is speculated to have been the Chinese thunder crash bomb. Japanese descriptions of the invasions also talk of iron and bamboo pao causing "light and fire" and emitting 2–3,000 iron bullets.

Hand cannon

Traditionally the first appearance of the hand cannon is dated to the late 13th century, just after the Mongol conquest of the Song dynasty. However a sculpture depicting a figure carrying a gourd shaped hand cannon was discovered among the Dazu Rock Carvings in 1985 by Robin Yates. The sculptures were completed roughly 250 km northwest of Chongqing by 1128, after the fall of Kaifeng to the Jin dynasty. If the dating is correct this would push back the appearance of the cannon in China by a hundred years more than previously thought. The bulbous nature of the cannon is congruous with the earliest hand cannons discovered in China and Europe.

Archaeological samples of the gun, specifically the hand cannon (huochong), have been dated starting from the 13th century. The oldest extant gun whose dating is unequivocal is the Xanadu Gun, so called because it was discovered in the ruins of Xanadu, the Mongol summer palace in Inner Mongolia. The Xanadu Gun is 34.7 cm in length and weighs 6.2 kg. Its dating is based on archaeological context and a straightforward inscription whose era name and year corresponds with the Gregorian Calendar at 1298. Not only does the inscription contain the era name and date, it also includes a serial number and manufacturing information which suggests that gun production had already become systematized, or at least become a somewhat standardized affair by the time of its fabrication. The design of the gun includes axial holes in its rear which some speculate could have been used in a mounting mechanism. Like most early guns with the possible exception of the Western Xia gun, it is small, weighing just over six kilograms and thirty-five centimeters in length. Although the Xanadu Gun is the most precisely dated gun from the 13th century, other extant samples with approximate dating likely predate it.

One candidate is the Heilongjiang hand cannon, discovered in 1970, and named after the province of its discovery, Heilongjiang, in northeastern China. It is small and light like the Xanadu gun, weighing only 3.5 kilograms, 34 cm (Needham says 35 cm), and a bore of approximately 2.5 cm. Based on contextual evidence, historians believe it was used by Yuan forces against a rebellion by Mongol prince Nayan in 1287. The History of Yuan states that a Jurchen commander known as Li Ting led troops armed with hand cannons into battle against Nayan. It reports that the cannons of Li Ting's soldiers "caused great damage," but also created "such confusion that the enemy soldiers attacked and killed each other." The hand cannons were used again in the beginning of 1288. Li Ting's "gun-soldiers" or chongzu were able to carry the hand cannons "on their backs". The passage on the 1288 battle is also the first to coin the name chong with the metal radical jin for metal-barrel firearms. Chong was used instead of the earlier and more ambiguous term huo tong (fire tube), which may refer to the tubes of fire lances, proto-cannons, or signal flares.

Even older, the Ningxia gun was found in Ningxia Hui Autonomous Region by collector Meng Jianmin (孟建民). This Yuan dynasty firearm is 34.6 cm long, the muzzle 2.6 cm in diameter, and weighs 1.55 kilograms. The firearm contains a transcription reading, "Made by bronzesmith Li Liujing in the year Zhiyuan 8 (直元), ningzi number 2565" (銅匠作頭李六徑，直元捌年造，寧字二仟伍百陸拾伍號). Similar to the Xanadu Gun, it bears a serial number 2565, which suggests it may have been part of a series of guns manufactured. While the era name and date corresponds with the Gregorian Calendar at 1271 CE, putting it earlier than both the Heilongjiang Hand Gun as well as the Xanadu Gun, but one of the characters used in the era name is irregular, causing some doubt among scholars on the exact date of production.

Another specimen, the Wuwei Bronze Cannon, was discovered in 1980 and may possibly be the oldest as well as largest cannon of the 13th century: a 100 centimeter 108 kilogram bronze cannon discovered in a cellar in Wuwei, Gansu Province containing no inscription, but has been dated by historians to the late Western Xia period between 1214 and 1227. The gun contained an iron ball about nine centimeters in diameter, which is smaller than the muzzle diameter at twelve centimeters, and 0.1 kilograms of gunpowder in it when discovered, meaning that the projectile might have been another co-viative. Ben Sinvany and Dang Shoushan believe that the ball used to be much larger prior to its highly corroded state at the time of discovery. While large in size, the weapon is noticeably more primitive than later Yuan dynasty guns, and is unevenly cast. A similar weapon was discovered not far from the discovery site in 1997, but much smaller in size at only 1.5 kg. Chen Bingying disputes this however, and argues there were no guns before 1259, while Dang Shoushan believes the Western Xia guns point to the appearance of guns by 1220, and Stephen Haw goes even further by stating that guns were developed as early as 1200. Sinologist Joseph Needham and renaissance siege expert Thomas Arnold provide a more conservative estimate of around 1280 for the appearance of the "true" cannon. Whether or not any of these are correct, it seems likely that the gun was born sometime during the 13th century.

Catapults and machines 

Technology was one of the important facets of Mongolian warfare. For instance, siege machines were an important part of Genghis Khan's warfare, especially in attacking fortified cities. The siege engines were not disassembled and carried by horses to be rebuilt at the site of the battle, as was the usual practice with European armies. Instead the Mongol horde would travel with skilled engineers who would build siege engines from scratch from materials on site.

The engineers building the machines were recruited among captives, mostly from China and Persia, led by a Han general Guo Kan. When Mongols slaughtered the whole population from settlements that resisted or did not surrender, they often spared the engineers and other units, swiftly assimilating them into the Mongol armies.

Engineers in Mongol service displayed a considerable degree of ingenuity and planning; during a siege of a fortified Chinese city, the defenders had taken care to remove all large rocks from the region to deny the Mongols an ammunition supply for their trebuchets, but the Mongol engineers resorted to cutting up logs which they soaked in water to make suitably heavy spheres. During the siege of the Assassins' fortress of Alamut the Mongols gathered large rocks from far and wide, piling them up in depots a day's journey from one another all the way to their siege lines so that a huge supply was available for the breaching batteries operating against the mighty citadel.  The Mongols also scouted the hills around the city to find suitable higher ground on which to mount ballistas manned by northern Chinese engineers, allowing these to snipe into the interior of the fortress. The Mongols made effective use of the siege technologies developed by their subject peoples; Genghis Khan utilized the Chinese engineers and traction trebuchets he had gained from his victories over the Jurchens and Tanguts during his Khwarezmian campaign, while Kublai Khan later called upon Muslim engineers from his Ilkhanate cousins to build counterweight trebuchets that finally concluded the six year siege of Fancheng and Xiangyang.

Kharash 
A commonly used Mongol tactic involved the use of the kharash. The Mongols would gather prisoners captured in previous battles, and would drive them forward in sieges and battles. These "shields" would often take the brunt of enemy arrows and crossbow-bolts, thus somewhat protecting the ethnically Mongol warriors.Commanders also used the kharash as assault units to breach walls.

Strategy 

The Mongol battlefield tactics were a combination of masterful training with excellent communication and discipline in the chaos of combat. They trained for virtually every possibility, so when it occurred, they could react accordingly. The Mongols also protected their ranking officers well. Their training and discipline allowed them to fight without the need for constant supervision or rallying, which often placed commanders in dangerous positions.

Whenever possible, Mongol commanders found the highest ground available, from which they could make tactical decisions based on the best view of the battlefield as events unfolded. Furthermore, being on high ground allowed their forces to observe commands conveyed by flags more easily than if the ground were level. In addition, keeping the high command on high ground made them easier to defend from sudden attacks and invasions.

Intelligence and planning 
The Mongols carefully scouted out and spied on their enemies in advance of any invasion. Prior to the invasion of Europe, Batu and Subutai sent spies for almost ten years into the heart of Europe, making maps of the old Roman roads, establishing trade routes, and determining the level of ability of each principality to resist invasion. They made well-educated guesses as to the willingness of each principality to aid the others, and their ability to resist alone or together. Also, when invading an area, the Mongols would do all that was necessary to completely conquer the town or cities. Some tactics involved diverting rivers from the city/town , closing supplies/resources to the city and waiting for its inhabitants to surrender, gathering civilians from the nearby areas to fill the front line for the city/town attack before scaling the wall, and pillaging the surrounding area and killing some of the people, then letting some survivors flee to the main city to report their losses to the main populace to weaken resistance, simultaneously draining the resources of the city with the sudden influx of refugees.

Psychological warfare and deception 

The Mongols used psychological warfare extremely successfully in many of their battles, especially in terms of spreading terror and fear to towns and cities. They often offered an opportunity for the enemy to surrender and pay tribute, instead of having their city ransacked and destroyed. They knew that sedentary populations were not free to flee danger as were nomad populations, and that the destruction of their cities was the worst loss a sedentary population could experience. When cities accepted the offer, they were spared, but were required to support the conquering Mongol army with manpower, supplies, and other services.

If the offer was refused, however, the Mongols would invade and destroy the city or town, but allow a few civilians to flee and spread terror by reporting their loss. These reports were an essential tool to incite fear in others. However, both sides often had a similar if differently motivated interest in overstating the enormity of the reported events: the Mongols' reputation would increase and the townspeople could use their reports of terror to raise an army. For that reason, specific data (e.g. casualty figures) given in contemporary sources needs to be evaluated carefully.

The Mongols also used deception very well in their wars. For instance, when approaching a mobile army the units would be split into three or more army groups, each trying to outflank and surprise their opponents. This created many battlefield scenarios for the opponents where the Mongols would seem to appear out of nowhere and there were seemingly more of them than in actuality. Flanking and/or feigned retreat if the enemy could not be handled easily was one of the most practiced techniques. Other techniques used commonly by the Mongols were completely psychological and were used to entice/lure enemies into vulnerable positions by showing themselves from a hill or some other predetermined locations, then disappearing into the woods or behind hills while the Mongols' flank troops already strategically positioned would appear as if out of nowhere from the left, right and/or from their rear. During the initial states of battlefield contact, while camping in close proximity of their enemies at night, they would feign numerical superiority by ordering each soldier to flight at least five fires, which would appear to the enemy scouts and spies that their force was almost five times larger than it actually was.

Another way the Mongols used deception and terror was by tying tree branches or leaves behind their horses. They dragged the foliage behind them in a systematic fashion to create dust storms behind hills to appear to the enemy as a much larger attacking army, thereby forcing the enemy to surrender. Because each Mongol soldier had more than one horse, they would let prisoners and civilians ride their horses for a while before the conflict, also to exaggerate their manpower.

Inclusion
As they were conquering new people, the Mongols integrated into their armies the conquered people's men if they had surrendered - willingly or otherwise. Therefore, as they expanded into other areas and conquered other people, their troop numbers increased. Exemplifying this is the Battle of Baghdad, during which many diverse people fought under Mongol lordship. Despite this integration, the Mongols were never able to gain long-term loyalty from the settled peoples that they conquered.

Ground tactics
The tumens would typically advance on a broad front, five lines deep. The first three lines would be composed of horse archers, the last two of lancers. Once an enemy force was located, the Mongols would try to avoid risky or reckless frontal assaults. Instead they would use diversionary attacks to fix the enemy in place, while their main forces sought to outflank or surround the foe. First the horse archers would lay down a barrage of arrow fire. Additional arrows were carried by camels who followed close by, ensuring a plentiful supply of ammunition.

Flanking

In all battlefield situations, the troops would be divided into separate formations of 10, 100, 1,000 or 10,000 depending on the requirements. If the number of troops split from the main force was significant, for instance 10,000 or more, these would be handed over to a significant or second-in-command leader, while the main leader concentrated on the front line. The leader of the Mongols would generally issue the tactics used to attack the enemy. For instance the leader might order, upon seeing a city or town, "500 to the left and 500 to the right" of the city; those instructions would then be relayed to the relevant 5 units of 100 soldiers, and these would attempt to flank or encircle the town to the left and right.

Encirclement and opening
The main point of these maneuvers was to encircle the city to cut off escape and overwhelm their enemies from both sides. If the situation deteriorated on one of the fronts or flanks, the leader from the hill directed one part of the army to support the other. If it appeared that there was going to be significant loss, the Mongols would retreat to save their troops and would engage the next day, or the next month, after having studied the enemies' tactics and defenses in the first battle, or again send a demand to surrender after inflicting some form of damage. There was no fixture on when or where units should be deployed: it was dependent on battle circumstances, and the flanks and groups had full authority on what to do in the course of battle - such as supporting other flanks or performing an individual feigned retreat as conditions seemed appropriate, in small groups of 100 to 1000 - so long as the battle unfolded according to the general directive and the opponents were defeated.

Feigned retreat
The Mongols very commonly practiced the feigned retreat, perhaps the most difficult battlefield tactic to execute. This is because a feigned rout amongst untrained troops can often turn into a real rout if an enemy presses into it. Pretending disarray and defeat in the heat of the battle, the Mongols would suddenly appear panicked and turn and run, only to pivot when the enemy was drawn out, destroying them at their leisure. As this tactic became better known to the enemy, the Mongols would extend their feigned retreats for days or weeks, to falsely convince the chasers that they were defeated, only to charge back once the enemy again had its guard down or withdrew to join its main formation. The most famous battle involving this tactic was during the Battle of Kalka river.

See also
Cavalry 
Eight Banners
Endemic warfare
Genghis Khan
Horses in East Asian warfare
Mongol Empire
Mounted archery
Timeline of Mongol invasions

References

Bibliography
Amitai-Preiss, Reuven. The Mamluk-Ilkhanid War, 1998
 .
 
Chambers, James, The Devil's Horsemen: The Mongol Invasion of Europe. Book Sales Press, 2003.
R.E. Dupuy and T.N. Dupuy -- The Encyclopedia Of Military History: From 3500 B.C. To The Present. (2nd Revised Edition 1986)
Hildinger, Erik -- Warriors of the Steppe: A Military History of Central Asia, 500 B.C. to A.D. 1700. Da Capo Press, 2001. 
Morgan, David -- The Mongols. Wiley-Blackwell, 
Jones Archer -- Art of War in the Western World [1]
 
 
May, Timothy "The Mongol Art of War." Westholme Publishing - The Mongol Art of War Westholme Publishing, Yardley. 2007.

 
 .
Nicolle, David -- The Mongol Warlords Brockhampton Press, 1998
Charles Oman -- The History of the Art of War in the Middle Ages (1898, rev. ed. 1953)
 .
 
 
 
Saunders, J.J. -- The History of the Mongol Conquests, Routledge & Kegan Paul Ltd, 1971, 
Sicker, Martin -- The Islamic World in Ascendancy: From the Arab Conquests to the Siege of Vienna, Praeger Publishers, 2000
Soucek, Svatopluk -- A History of Inner Asia, Cambridge, 2000
Verbruggen, J.F. -- The Art of Warfare in Western Europe during the Middle Ages, Boydell Press, Second English translation 1997, 
Iggulden, Conn -- Genghis, Birth of an Empire, Bantham Dell.

External links
Medieval History: Mongol Invasion of Europe at Medieval and Renaissance History

Military history of the Mongol Empire
Military tactics by war